Michael Gayfer (born 17 August 1965) is a former Australian rules footballer who played for Collingwood in the Australian Football League (AFL).

References

External links

Australian rules footballers from New South Wales
Collingwood Football Club players
Collingwood Football Club Premiership players
Caulfield Football Club players
Corowa-Rutherglen Football Club players
1965 births
Living people
One-time VFL/AFL Premiership players